The Bath Avenue Historic District, in Ashland, Kentucky, is a  historic district which was listed on the National Register of Historic Places in 1979.  It included 26 contributing buildings and two contributing objects.

It is a four-block section of Bath Avenue, running from 13th to 17th Streets, out of a six-block stretch which "has been considered to be the city's most prestigious residential neighborhood."

See also 
 Mayo Mansion (Ashland, Kentucky): a contributing property

References

Historic districts on the National Register of Historic Places in Kentucky
National Register of Historic Places in Boyd County, Kentucky
Victorian architecture in Kentucky
Houses completed in 1856
1856 establishments in Kentucky
Neighborhoods in Kentucky
Ashland, Kentucky
Houses in Boyd County, Kentucky